This is a list of Investment banks and stockbrokerage firms in Kenya They are regulated by the Capital Markets Authority and the Nairobi Securities Exchange:

 ABC Capital
 African Alliance Kenya Investment Bank 
 Afrika Investment Bank 
 ApexAfrica Capital 
 CBA Capital
 Discount Securities   (Under Statutory management)
 Dry Associates Investment Bank
 Dyer & Blair Investment Bank
 Equity Investment Bank
 Faida Investment Bank 
 Hakuna Ventures
 Francis Drummond & Company 
 Genghis Capital
 Kestrel Capital
 Kingdom Securities 
 Ngenye Kariuki & Co   (Under Statutory management)
 NIC Securities 
 Old Mutual Securities 
 Renaissance Capital (Kenya)
 SBG Securities 
 Standard Investment Bank 
  Sterling Capital Limited 
 Suntra Investment Bank

References

See also
 Central Bank of Kenya
Nairobi Securities Exchange
 Capital Markets Authority
 Companies traded on the Nairobi Securities Exchange
 List of banks in Africa
 Economy of Kenya

Investment
Investment banks